Torød is a village and statistical area (grunnkrets) in Nøtterøy municipality, Norway.

The statistical area Torød, which also can include the peripheral parts of the village as well as the surrounding countryside, has a population of 637.

The village Torød is located between Buerstad in the southwest, and Årøysund in the east. It is considered a part of the urban settlement Årøysund, which covers the southern part of the island. The urban settlement Årøysund has a population of 2,069.

References

Villages in Vestfold og Telemark
Nøtterøy